This article details men's professional association football club records and statistics (individual and collective) in Europe.

All competitions for men's european association football clubs

Individual records

Most goals in a season in all club competitions (since the modern offsides rule was introduced in 1925)

 

Club records

Most consecutive national league titles
Source:
 14 – Skonto Riga (1991–2004)
 14 – Lincoln Red Imps (2003–2016)
 13 – Rosenborg (1992–2004)
 13 – BATE Borisov (2006–2018)
 11 – Ludogorets Razgrad (2012–present)
 11 –Ansar FC (1988–1999)
 11 – Dinamo Zagreb (2006–2016)
 10 – MTK Budapest (1914, 1917–1925)
 10 – BFC Dynamo (1979–1988)
 10 – Dinamo Tbilisi (1990–1999)
 10 – Pyunik (2001–2010)
 10 – Sheriff Tiraspol (2001–2010)
 10 – Bayern Munich (2013–present)

Longest unbeaten run across all competitions
Source:
 62 – Celtic (1915–1917)
 60 – Union SG (1933–1935)

After the introduction of UEFA club competitions (1955–56)
 48 – Benfica (1963–1965)
 45 – Dinamo Zagreb (2014–2015)
 45 – Rijeka (2016–2017)
 44 – Rangers (1992–1993)
 43 – Juventus (2011–2012)
 42 – Milan (1991–1992)
 42 – Ajax (1995–1996)
 40 – Fiorentina (1955–1956)
 40 – Nottingham Forest (1978)
 40 – Real Madrid (2016–2017)
 40 – Red Star Belgrade (2020–2021)

Most consecutive wins across all competitions
Italic denotes record that was not achieved in country's top tier (unofficial record for non professional leagues).
 36 – Jersey Bulls in 2019–20 and 2020–21
 32 – South Shields in 2016–17
 27 – Hereford FC in 2015–16
 27 – East Kilbride in 2016–17
 27 – The New Saints in 2016–17
 26 – Dresdner SC in 1942–43
 26 – Ajax in 1971–72
 26 – Salisbury City reserves in 2007–08
 23 – Red Star Belgrade in 1999–2000 and 2000–01
 23 – Bayern Munich in 2019–20 and 2020–21
 22 – Real Madrid in 2014–15
 21 – Manchester City in 2020–21
 18 – Barcelona in 2005–06
 18 – Benfica in 2010–11
 18 – Porto in 2018–19
 17 – Galatasaray in 2022–23
 16 – Bordeaux in 2008–09 and 2009–10
 16 – Paris Saint-Germain in 2015–16
 15 – Milan in 1991–92 and 1992–93
 15 – Real Madrid in 2011–12

Longest unbeaten league run
Source:
 104 – Steaua București (1986–1989)
 88 – Lincoln Red Imps (2009–2014)
 63 – Sheriff Tiraspol (2006–2008)
 62 – Celtic (1915–1917)
 61 – Levadia (2008–2009)
 60 – Union SG (1933–1935)
 59 – Shirak (1993–1995)
 59 – Pyunik (2002–2004)
 58 – Milan (1991–1993)
 58 – Olympiacos (1972–1974)
 58 – Porto (2020–2022)
 58 – Skonto (1993–1996)
 57 – Red Star Belgrade (2017–2019)
 56 – Celtic (2016–2017)
 56 – Benfica (1976–1978)
 55 – Porto (2010–2012)
 55 – Shakhtar Donetsk (2000–2002)

Longest unbeaten league home run
Source:
 121 – Real Madrid (1957–1965)
 96 – Red Star Belgrade (1998–2004)
 93 – PSV Eindhoven (1983–1989)
 92 – Nantes (1976–1981)
 91 – Torino (1943–1949)
 90 – Trabzonspor (1975–1981)
 89 – Spartak Trnava (1968–1974)
 86 – Chelsea (2004–2008)
 85 – Panathinaikos (1973–1978)
 81 – Porto (2008–2014)

Most consecutive wins in domestic league
Source:

Italic denotes record that was not achieved in country's top tier (unofficial record for non-professional leagues).

 30 – Tiverton Town, between 1995–96 and 1996–97
 29 – Benfica, between 1971–72 and 1972–73
 28 – Ferencváros in 1931–32 and 1932–33
 28 – Dinamo Zagreb, between 2006–07 and 2007–08
 25 – Dinamo Tirana, between 1951 and 1952
 25 – Celtic in 2003–04
 24 – Red Star Belgrade in 2015–16
 23 – Dresdner SC in 1942–43
 23 – Malmö FF, between 1948–49 and 1949–50
 22 – PSV Eindhoven in 1987–88
 22 – Kapaz in 1997–98
 22 – The New Saints in 2016–17
 19 – Ajax in 1971–72, between 1994–95 and 1995–96
 19 – Bayern Munich in 2013–14
 19 – Hereford in 2015–16
 18 – Manchester City in 2017–18
 18 – Liverpool in 2019–20

Longest run of games scored in 
 Bayern Munich – 85 (16 February 2020 – 23 October 2021)
 Real Madrid – 73 (30 April 2016 – 17 September 2017)
 Bayern Munich – 61 (16 March 2013 – 5 April 2014)

Highest attendance at a European domestic match
147,365 – Celtic vs Aberdeen, 1936-37 Scottish Cup

Highest goal margin (aggregate) in European Cup
 18 – Benfica against Stade Dudelange in 1965–66 European Cup
First leg score: Stade Dudelange 0–8 Benfica
Second leg score: Benfica 10–0 Stade Dudelange
Aggregate score: Benfica 18–0 Stade Dudelange

Biggest title-winning points margins
Source:
 31 – Paris Saint-Germain in 2015–16
 31 – Maccabi Tel Aviv in 2018–19
 31 – Young Boys in 2020–21
 30 – Celtic in 2016–17
 29 – Celtic in 2013–14
 28 – Dinamo Zagreb in 2007–08
 28 – Olympiacos in 2015–16
 27 – Skonto in 1997
 27 – The New Saints in 2016–17
 26 – Barry Town in 1997–98
 26 – Copenhagen in 2010–11

See also

European Golden Shoe
List of world association football records
UEFA club competition records and statistics

References

Further reading

External links
 England All-Time Topscorers - Top Level Only (archived)

Association football club records and statistics
Records